Cliftonville Curve is a short railway that links the West Coastway Line to the Brighton Main Line between Hove and Preston Park. It was opened in July 1879.  The curve includes a  tunnel.

The line, which is also known as the Cliftonville Spur, was named in reference to Cliftonville station (now called ) which had opened in 1865. Cliftonville was an area of Hove which was developed speculatively as a "fashionable neighbourhood" in the mid-19th century.

References

Bibliography

External links
Brighton Loco Works: Chapter 3

Rail transport in East Sussex
Rail junctions in England
Railway lines in South East England
Railway tunnels in England